is a retired professional Japanese baseball player. He was a pitcher for the Chunichi Dragons.

Early career

In his university career, Kaneko performed as both a starter and a reliever for Osaka University of Commerce. In the Kansai6 Baseball League in Spring of his third year, Kaneko recorded 4 consecutive shutouts. His overall record for his university was 65 games played with a 23–17 win-loss record and a 1.85 ERA. He is one year the university senior of teammate, Iori Katsura.

At the 2014 Nippon Professional Baseball draft, Kaneko was selected 9th by the Chunichi Dragons where he went on to sign a ¥6,000,000 contract with a ¥15,000,000 sign on bonus.

Professional career

Chunichi Dragons

2015
On 16 April, Kaneko made his debut against the Hanshin Tigers at the Nagoya Dome in one inning of relief where he retired 3 batters in a row. He was the first of the 4 pitchers drafted in 2014 to make his debut.

Kaneko would go on to play in a further 10 games all coming as a relief pitcher where he threw 13.2 innings with a 3.95 ERA and 12 strikeouts.

2016
Only one appearance would happen for Kaneko in 2016 where on May 8 he took charge of the 9th inning against the Yomiuri Giants with the Dragons holding an 11–2 lead where Kaneko gave up a 2-run homerun to Yoshiyuki Kamei before closing out.

References

External links
 Dragons.jp
 NPB.jp

1993 births
Living people
Baseball people from Osaka Prefecture
Japanese baseball players
Nippon Professional Baseball pitchers
Chunichi Dragons players
People from Ibaraki, Osaka